Rochdale Village is student housing cooperative apartment complex in Berkeley, California. The property is owned by UC Berkeley and leased by the  Berkeley Student Cooperative (BSC).  It was built during the late 1960s and early 1970s, with money loaned by the Department of Housing and Urban Development to the BSC (then known as the University Student's Cooperative Association).  With approximately 260 residents, it is the largest housing co-op in Berkeley and one of the largest student housing cooperatives in the world.  It lies at an elevation of 236 feet (72 m).

References

Apartment buildings in California
Berkeley Student Cooperative
Buildings and structures in Berkeley, California
Residential buildings in Alameda County, California